Cautethia exuma is a species of moth in the family Sphingidae, which is known from the Bahamas. It was described by Timothy L. McCabe in 1984.

Moths in this species have a wingspan of 27–32 millimetres. They are immediately distinguishable from all other Cautethia species by the pale yellow-brown basal area of the hindwing upperside.

The larvae probably feed on Rubiaceae species.

References

Cautethia
Moths described in 1984